Dario Kostovic (born August 8, 1980) is a Swiss-Croatian former professional ice hockey player who last played for KHL Medveščak Zagreb of the Kontinental Hockey League (KHL). He took up a head coaching position in the Swiss Junior Elite B league upon completing his professional career in the 2014–15 season.

References

External links

1980 births
Living people
Croatian ice hockey left wingers
HC Lugano players
KHL Medveščak Zagreb players
EHC Kloten players
Lausanne HC players
Sportspeople from Split, Croatia
Swiss ice hockey left wingers
ZSC Lions players